Sagoni Kalan may refer to:

 Sagoni Kalan, Berasia, a village in Berasia tehsil of Bhopal district, Madhya Pradesh, India
 Sagoni Kalan, Huzur, a village in Huzur tehsil of Bhopal district, Madhya Pradesh, India